Middle Saranac Lake, also called Round Lake, is the smallest of three connected lakes, part of the Saranac River, near the village of Saranac Lake in the Adirondacks in northern New York. Two-thirds of its shoreline is state-owned. The lake is located in the towns of Harrietstown and Santa Clara, in Franklin County.

With Upper Saranac Lake and Lower Saranac Lake, a 17-mile paddle with only one portage is possible. Weller Pond, made famous by Martha Reben's The Healing Woods, can be reached via an outlet of Hungry Bay on the north shore. The Saranac Lake Islands Public Campground provides 87 campsites on Middle and Lower Saranac Lake. The lake, along with both Upper and Lower Saranac Lakes, is also part of the 740-mile Northern Forest Canoe Trail, which begins in Old Forge, NY and ends in Fort Kent, ME.

History
Prior to the development of railroads and the automobile, the Saranac Lakes formed part of an important transportation route in the Adirondacks; one could travel 140 miles across, from Old Forge to Lake Champlain, almost entirely on water.

See also
 Adirondacks
 Upper Saranac Lake
 Lower Saranac Lake
 Northern Forest Canoe Trail

References

External links
 New York State DEC - Camping Information

Sources
Jamieson, Paul and Morris, Donald, Adirondack Canoe Waters, North Flow, Lake George, NY: Adirondack Mountain Club, 1987. .

Adirondacks
Lakes of New York (state)
Protected areas of Franklin County, New York
Lakes of Franklin County, New York
Northern Forest Canoe Trail
Saranac Lake, New York